The genus Satyrium contains butterflies in the family Lycaenidae. The species of this genus are found in the Holarctic ecozone. For distribution information see Further reading "Le genre Satyrium".

Species
Listed alphabetically within species group.

The Satyrium species group:
 Satyrium acadica (Edwards, 1862) – Acadian hairstreak
 Satyrium auretorum (Boisduval, 1852) – gold hunter's hairstreak
 Satyrium behrii (Edwards, 1870) – Behr's hairstreak
 Satyrium calanus (Hübner, 1809) – banded hairstreak
 Satyrium californica (Edwards, 1862) – California hairstreak
 Satyrium caryaevorum (McDunnough, 1942) – hickory hairstreak
 Satyrium edwardsii (Grote and Robinson, 1867) – Edward's hairstreak
 Satyrium fuliginosum (Edwards, 1861) – sooty hairstreak
 Satyrium iyonis (Oxta and Kusunoki, 1957)
 Satyrium kingi (Klots and Clench, 1952) – King's hairstreak
 Satyrium liparops (Boisduval and Leconte, 1833) – striped hairstreak
 Satyrium saepium (Boisduval, 1852) – hedgerow hairstreak
 Satyrium semiluna Klots, 1930 - sagebrush sooty hairstreak or half-moon hairstreak
 Satyrium sylvinus (Boisduval, 1852) – sylvan hairstreak
 Satyrium tetra (Edwards, 1870) – mountain mahogany hairstreak
 Satyrium titus (Fabricius, 1793) – coral hairstreak

The Armenia species group:
 Satyrium hyrcanicum (Riley, 1939) – Hyrcanian hairstreak
 Satyrium ledereri (Boisduval, 1848) – orange banded hairstreak

The Nordmannia species group:
 Satyrium abdominalis (Gerhard, 1850) – Gerhard's black hairstreak
 Satyrium acaciae (Fabricius, 1787) – sloe hairstreak
 Satyrium esculi (Hübner, 1804) – false ilex hairstreak
 Satyrium eximia (Fixsen, 1887)
 Satyrium favonius (Smith, 1797) – southern hairstreak
 Satyrium guichardi (Higgins, 1965)
 Satyrium herzi (Fixsen, 1887)
 Satyrium ilavia (Beutenmüller, 1899)
 Satyrium ilicis (Esper, 1779) – ilex hairstreak
 Satyrium latior (Fixsen, 1887)
 Satyrium myrtale (Klug, 1834) – Rebel's hairstreak
 Satyrium polingi (Barnes & Benjamin, 1926)
 Satyrium pruni (Linnaeus, 1758) – black hairstreak
 Satyrium prunoides (Staudinger, 1887)
 Satyrium runides (Zhdanko, 1990)
 Satyrium spini (Schiffermüller, 1775) – blue spot hairstreak
 Satyrium tateishii (Matsumoto, 2006)
 Satyrium thalia (Leech, 1893)
 Satyrium w-album (Knoch, 1782) – white-letter hairstreak

The Superflua species group:
 Satyrium acaudata Staudinger, 1901
 Satyrium goniopterum Lukhtanov, 1995
 Satyrium lunulata (Erschoff, 1874)
 Satyrium sassanides (Kollar, [1849]) – whiteline hairstreak

Unknown species group:
 Satyrium armenum (Rebel, 1901)
 Satyrium austrina (Murayama, 1943)
 Satyrium dejeani (Riley, 1939)
 Satyrium esakii (Shirôzu, 1941)
 Satyrium formosana (Matsumura, 1910)
 Satyrium grandis (Felder and Felder, 1862)
 Satyrium inouei (Shirôzu, 1959)
 Satyrium iyonis (Oxta & Kusunoki, 1957)
 Satyrium jebelia Nakamura, 1975
 Satyrium kongmingi Murayama, 1992
 Satyrium kuboi (Chou and Tong, 1994)
 Satyrium lais (Leech, 1892)
 Satyrium mackwoodi (Evans, 1914) – Mackwood's hairstreak
 Satyrium marcidus (Riley, 1921)
 Satyrium mardinus van Oorschot, van den Brink, van Oorschot, 1985
 Satyrium mera (Janson, 1873)
 Satyrium minshanicum Murayama, 1992
 Satyrium neoeximia Murayama, 1992
 Satyrium oenone Leech, [1893]
 Satyrium ornata (Leech, 1890)
 Satyrium patrius (Leech, 1891)
 Satyrium percomis (Leech, 1894)
 Satyrium persimilis (Riley, 1939)
 Satyrium phyllodendri (Elwes, [1882])
 Satyrium pseudopruni Murayama, 1992
 Satyrium redae Bozano, 1993
 Satyrium rubicundula (Leech, 1890)
 Satyrium siguniangshanicum Murayama, 1992
 Satyrium tanakai (Shirôzu, 1942)
 Satyrium v-album (Oberthür, 1886)
 Satyrium watarii (Matsumura, 1927)
 Satyrium xumini Huang, 2001
 Satyrium yangi (Riley, 1939)
 Satyrium volt (Sugiyama, 1993)

Gallery

References

 Biolib
Images representing Satyrium

Further reading
Satyrium ("Le genre Satyrium") provides distribution information in French Wikipedia.

 at Consortium for the Barcode of Life

 
Eumaeini
Lycaenidae genera
Taxa named by Samuel Hubbard Scudder